The Sony Digital Paper DPT-S1 or Sony DPT-S1  is a discontinued 13.3-inch (approaching A4) E ink e-reader by Sony, aimed at professional business users. The DPT-S1 Digital Paper can display only PDF files at their native size and lacks the ability to display any other e-book formats. The reader has been criticized for being too expensive for most consumers, with an initial price of US$1,100, falling to $700 at its end. The reader is lightweight and has low power consumption, a Wi-Fi connection, and a stylus for making notes or highlights. Sony announced the discontinuation of the DPT-S1 in late 2016. Its successors are the Sony DPT-RP1 (released 2017, 13.3-inch screen) and Sony DPT-CP1 (released 2018, 10.3-inch screen), all inside the Sony DPT line of products.

Specifications 
The 13.3-inch e-Ink Mobius electronic paper screen has a resolution of  pixels, with a capacitive touchscreen. The device has an ARM Cortex-A8 at 1 GHz microprocessor. It was built on a SoC circuit made by Freescale. The amount of RAM was not published anywhere. Its internal storage, 4 GB, is shared between system and user; however, it is possible to expand the storage with a microSD card. It weighs 358 g (0.8 pounds) with a thickness of 6.8 mm. Novel to the DPT-S1 was the ability to interface with specific corporate networks by adding encryption, thus allowing legal professionals to make use of it in their workflow by integrating handwritten annotations into PDFs that could propagate when copied.

See also
 Comparison of e-book readers
 Comparison of tablet computers

References

External links
 Official site
  Sony 13-inch (DPT-S1) Digital Paper Review | youtube.com video | 16:51 | published 8 August 2014

Sony hardware
Electronic paper technology